Qanat Kuchek-e Olya (also Romanized as Qanāt Kūcheḵ-e ‘Olyā) is a village in Behnamarab-e Jonubi Rural District, Javadabad District, Varamin County, Tehran Province, Iran. At the 2006 census, its population was 15, in 4 families.

References 

Populated places in Varamin County